RF is an abbreviation for radio frequency.

Rf or RF may also mean:

Arts and entertainment
 Red Faction (series), a series of revolution video games
 Rinforzando, in music notation
 RF Online, an online RPG made by CCR

Business
 Aero K, IATA code (2020—present)
 Florida West International Airways, IATA code (1984—2017)
 Regions Financial Corporation, NYSE stock symbol
 Registered association (Finland) (Registrerad förening), Finnish legal status for a non-profit organization
 Royalty-free, in business

Government and military
 France (République française)
 Russian Federation
 Rhodesian Front, former political party in Rhodesia

Biology and medicine
 Rheumatic fever, an inflammatory disease
 Release factors RF1, RF2, RF3, proteins
 Reticular formation, in the brainstem
 Rheumatoid factor, an antibody
 Receptive field, the response characteristic of a neuron
 Respiratory failure
 Risk factor

Other uses in science and technology
 Representative fraction
 Retardation factor in a chromatographic system
 Radiative forcing, the change in energy flux in the atmosphere caused by climate change factors
 Random forest, an ensemble learning method in data science
 Rutherfordium, symbol Rf, a chemical element
 Canon RF mount, interchangeable camera lens mount

Sports
 Range Factor, a baseball statistic
 Right fielder, a defensive position in baseball
 Swedish Sports Confederation (RF), the umbrella organisation for Swedish sports